Petrocosmea forrestii is a species of flowering plant in the family Gesneriaceae native to China, and sometimes cultivated as a houseplant. It grows among rocks in shady places. Like other species in its genus, it does not develop a stem above ground, but spreads by rhizomes.

References

forrestii
Flora of China
House plants
Taxa named by William Grant Craib